The Datsun Go/Go+ is a city car and mini MPV with "5+2" seating capacity that was produced by the Japanese automaker Nissan under the Datsun brand (which was revived in 2013) between 2014 and 2022. Named after the "Dat-Go", Datsun's first car launched in the early 20th century, the Go was available in developing markets such as India, South Africa and Indonesia. It is built on the same V platform as the K13 Nissan Micra/March, from which it has inherited much of its components.

Overview 
The Go was unveiled globally in Delhi, India on 15 July 2013, and went on sale in India in early 2014. It was unveiled in Jakarta, Indonesia on 17 September 2013 and went on sale in mid-2014 under Indonesian government's "Low Cost Green Car" (LCGC) program.

The Go is powered by a 1.2-litre (1,198 cc) three-cylinder DOHC engine with electronic fuel injection, which is the same unit used in the Micra.

The Indonesian-market Go series was officially succeeded by the Nissan Magnite crossover SUV in early 2021 after Nissan ceased production of the Go series in 2020.

The Go series stopped production globally in 2022 as the Datsun brand discontinued for the second time.

Markets

Indonesia 
In Indonesia, the Go+ (marketed as Go+ Panca) was launched prior to the Go in May 2014 under the LCGC program. Initial trim levels were: D, A, A Option, T, and T Option. On 6 August 2014, the T Style trim (placed above T Option) was introduced.

In August 2014, the Go hatchback (marketed as Go Panca) was launched following the Go+. , it was available in three trims: T, T Option and T Active. Both T Style and T Active trims were equipped with body kits as standard.

The facelifted Go and Go+ with automatic transmission (CVT) were launched in Indonesia on 7 May 2018. Both shared the same dashboard as the Cross (the Go+ variant with crossover-inspired styling) that was launched earlier. On 2 August 2018, the Go Live special version was introduced. Later in 2019, it became equipped with Vehicle Dynamic Control (VDC).

India 
The Go+ was launched in India in 2015. At that time, it was available in four trim levels.

Datsun Cross 
The Datsun Cross is the crossover-inspired variant of the Go+. It was launched in Indonesia on 18 January 2018.

Safety 
During a crash test in India, the Go with no airbags and no ABS received a zero-star rating from Global NCAP in 2014, prompting NCAP's chairman Max Mosley to request that the car be withdrawn from the market in a letter to Renault-Nissan CEO Carlos Ghosn as it was completely wrecked during the test.

The African version of the Datsun Go+ with driver airbag and no ABS received 1 star for adult occupants and 2 stars for infants from Global NCAP in 2017 (similar to Latin NCAP 2013).

Awards 
In the 2016 Frost & Sullivan Automotive Awards, the Go+ received "Indonesia Value-For-Money Car of the Year Award" for its market share, product innovation and also marketing and business development strategies.

Sales 
From its launch in 2014 up to May 2015, both the Go and Go+ sold for almost 30,000 units in Indonesia, which 70 percent of it came from the Go+.

References

External links 

 

Go
Cars introduced in 2014

2020s cars
Front-wheel-drive vehicles
City cars
Mini MPVs
Hatchbacks
Vehicles with CVT transmission
Global NCAP superminis